Vésztő is a town in Békés county, in the Southern Great Plain region of south-east Hungary.

Geography
It covers an area of 125.76 km² and has a population of 6855 people (2015). The town is situated in the Tisza plain.

History
North of the modern town there is the archaeological site of a neolithic tell. At its top the medieval Csolt monastery is located.

The jewish community 
In the 19th century, a Jewish community lived in the village. Most of them worked as merchants and later became industrialists. Their non-Jewish neighbors trusted them and some Jews were even elected to the city council and were also active in the town's culture. Relationships with their neighbors were generally good.
The community had a Jewish school. The community synagogue was built in 1934 after the previous synagogue was destroyed in a flood.
In 1920, 181 Jews lived in the community.

In May 1944, after the German army entered Hungary, all the Jews were concentrated in a ghetto that included only two buildings in the city center, which were declared ghettos.

On June 21, all Jews were sent to the Solnok Ghetto, where the author, Ida Lang, was murdered as a result of torture. Most of the Jews were transferred from Solnok to the Auschwitz extermination camp.
After the war, 34 survivors returned to the city, erected a monument in memory of the murdered, and tried to rehabilitate the community without success.

Twin towns – sister cities
Vésztő is twinned with:

  Dumbrava, Romania (1991)
  Brăduț, Romania (1991)
  Vârghiș, Romania (1991)

Notable residents
 Menyhért Lakatos (1926 — 2007), Hungarian Romani writer
 László Hajdu (1947-), Hungarian economist and politician

References

External links

  in Hungarian, English and German

Populated places in Békés County
Jewish communities destroyed in the Holocaust